Ian Matthew Wright (born 10 March 1972) is an English former footballer  who played as a central defender. He started his career at Stoke City and later played for Bristol Rovers and Hull City before dropping down into non-league football with Hereford United.

Career
Wright started his career at Second Division side Stoke City's youth team. He passed through the youth ranks at City and was handed a professional contract with the club in 1990. He made his debut against Swindon Town on the final day of the 1989–90 season with Stoke already relegated to the Third Division. He struggled to establish himself in the first team and joined non-league Corby Town in 1992. He made just nine appearances for The "Potters" before he was released in 1993. He joined Bristol Rovers and spent three years with The "Pirates" and then joined Hull City in 1996. At Hull he became a regular in the side and made 73 league appearances. He is also remembered at Hull for scoring a crucial goal as they knocked Premier League side Crystal Palace out of the 1997–98 League Cup.
 
Wright joined Hereford United in 1998 and became club captain and was a solid, first choice centre back through some of Hereford's most troubled times. He scored several vital goals for the club, including two in the 2001–02 FA Cup against Wrexham and Swindon. He played almost 200 competitive matches for the club, scoring almost 30 goals. He left in 2003, having trained as an electrician and wishing to play part-time. He joined Burton Albion, where he scored on his debut, until a persistent ankle injury forced him to retire. However a year later he was back in action as defensive cover at Hednesford Town.

Wright signed for Chasetown but in February 2007 he announced his retirement from the game due to a serious injury to his cheekbone/eye socket which could have caused him blindness if he had carried on playing.

Career statistics
Source:

A.  The "Other" column constitutes appearances and goals in the Football League Trophy.

References

1972 births
Living people
English footballers
Footballers from Staffordshire
Stoke City F.C. players
Bristol Rovers F.C. players
Hull City A.F.C. players
Hereford United F.C. players
Burton Albion F.C. players
Hednesford Town F.C. players
Chasetown F.C. players
Sportspeople from Lichfield
English Football League players
National League (English football) players
Association football defenders